Dicliptera raui (a.k.a. Peristrophe speciosa) is a flowering plant in the family Acanthaceae.

Description
This species is a broad-leafed shrub with greyish stems and elliptic leaves that are approximately 8 cm. It has purple-pink flowers.

Distribution
It is a native of Northern India to Bangladesh and occurs in the foothills of the central & E. Himalayas up to altitudes of 1,600 metres.

References

Acanthaceae
Lamiales of Asia